Geneviève Fontanel (27 June 1936  – 17 March 2018) was a French stage and film actress. She was nominated for the César Awards 1978 for Best Supporting Actress for her role in L'Homme qui aimait les femmes.

She was a member of the Comédie-Française, from 1 September 1958 to 31 July 1962. In 1999, she received the Molière Award for Best Supporting Actress for her performance in "Délicate balance", and the next year she was again nominated for her performance in Raisons de famille.

Filmography

References

External links
 

1936 births
2018 deaths
French film actresses
French stage actresses
20th-century French actresses
21st-century French actresses
Actresses from Bordeaux